Sir Edward Thomas ffrench Bromhead, 2nd Baronet FRS FRSE (26 March 1789 – 14 March 1855) was a British landowner and mathematician, best remembered as patron of the mathematician and physicist George Green and mentor of George Boole.

Life
Born the son of Gonville Bromhead, 1st Baronet Bromhead (grandfather of the British second in command of the same name at Rorke's Drift) and Lady Jane ffrench, Baroness ffrench, in Dublin. Bromhead was educated at the University of Glasgow and later at Caius College, Cambridge ( B.A. 1812, M.A. 1815) before taking up the study of law at the Inner Temple in London. He was elected a Fellow of the Royal Society in 1817.  Returning to Lincolnshire, he became High Steward of Lincoln. He became the 2nd Bromhead baronet, of Thurlby Hall in 1822.

While at Cambridge, Bromhead was a founder of the Analytical Society, a precursor of the Cambridge Philosophical Society, together with John Herschel, George Peacock and Charles Babbage, with whom he maintained a close and lifelong friendship.  While he was, by all accounts, a gifted mathematician in his own right (although ill-health prevented him from pursuing his studies further), his greatest contribution to the subject is at second hand: having subscribed to the first publication of self-taught mathematician and physicist George Green, he encouraged Green to continue his research and to write further papers (which Bromhead sent on to be published in the Transactions of the Cambridge Philosophical Society and those of the Royal Society of Edinburgh).

Bromhead repeated his success by encouraging the young George Boole from Lincoln. Bromhead was President of the Lincoln Mechanics Institute in the Lincoln Greyfriars, where George Boole's father was the curator. Boole first came to public notice when he gave a lecture on the work of Sir Isaac Newton on 5 February 1835. The young Boole's development was fed by books that Bromhead supplied.

Bromhead lost his sight when he was old and he died unmarried at his home of Thurlby Hall in Thurlby, North Kesteven on 14 March 1855.

Arms

Selected publications 
 X. Remarks on the present state of botanical classification Philosophical Magazine Series 3 Volume 11, Issue 64-65, 1837
 XXVIII. Memoranda on the origin of the botanical alliances Philosophical Magazine Series 3 Volume 11, Issue 67, 1837

References

Bibliography
 
  Mentions Bromhead's role in the career of George Green.

19th-century English mathematicians
Mathematical analysts
Alumni of Gonville and Caius College, Cambridge
Scientists from Dublin (city)
Bromhead, Sir Edward, 2nd Baronet
1789 births
1855 deaths
Fellows of the Royal Society
Fellows of the Royal Society of Edinburgh